Fair Passenger is a 1957 Australian television film which aired on ABC. It was the first one-hour television drama produced in Melbourne, and aired there live on 17 July 1957.

It was described as a "drama of mixed romances".

Although it was kinescoped in order to be shown in Sydney, it is not known if the kinescope still exists. The UK version is lost.

Plot
Erica Tranmore is dissatisfied in her marriage with a quiet adoring husband. She goes to London on the pretext of visiting an old school friend, Meg, but actually to see an infatuated young man, Clive. She meets Rosemary, a young film star, at Meg's flat and sets out to captivate Meg's boss with a screen test.

Rosemary falls in love with Clive. Erica has an unsuccessful screen test and returns home.

Cast
Philip Stainton as Frank Clayton
Nicolette Bernard as Meggie Craig
Beverley Dunn
Marcia Hart as Erica Tramore
Walter Brown
Margaret Wolfit

Production
The show was based on a play by Aimee Stuart. It had been adapted for Australian radio in 1951 1952 and 1954 and for British TV in 1955 as part of anthology series London Playhouse.

The ABC had a site in the Melbourne suburb of Rippon Lea. However it did not have normal TV studio facilities yet so the production was filmed at a temporary studio at Coppin Hall in Richmond. (The studio was used for a six-month period from 1 July while the Rippon Lea studios were being built. Among the shows made there were variety shows, musicals and the Village Glee Club.)

It was the first hour-long television drama broadcast in Melbourne. Marcia Hart, who was in the cast, had previously appeared in the first hour long television drama broadcast in Chicago (a production of Gaslight).

See also
List of live television plays broadcast on Australian Broadcasting Corporation (1950s)

References

External links
Fair Passenger on IMDb

1957 television plays
1950s Australian television plays
Australian Broadcasting Corporation original programming
English-language television shows
Black-and-white Australian television shows
Lost television episodes